The Schwarzenstein is a mountain in the Zillertal Alps on the border between Tyrol, Austria, and South Tyrol, Italy.

References 
 Heinrich Klier, Walter Klier: Alpine Club Guide Zillertaler Alpen, Munich, 1996, 
 Alpine Club Map 1:25,000, Sheet 35/2, Zillertaler Alpen, Mitte

External links 

Mountains of the Alps
Mountains of Tyrol (state)
Mountains of South Tyrol
Alpine three-thousanders
Zillertal Alps
Austria–Italy border
International mountains of Europe